Maung Maung Nge (born 12 February 1978) is a Burmese long-distance runner. He competed in the men's 5000 metres at the 2000 Summer Olympics.

References

External links
 

1978 births
Living people
Athletes (track and field) at the 2000 Summer Olympics
Burmese male long-distance runners
Olympic athletes of Myanmar
Place of birth missing (living people)